Gloria Spencer (March 18, 1937 – April 2, 1976) was an American gospel singer who was billed as the "World's Largest Gospel Singer" due to a glandular condition that caused her to weigh . Over the course of her four-year career, Spencer released only two albums. She was noted for her "sparkling soprano that could easily show a pop feeling or a gritty one." Spencer died of congestive heart failure in April 1976.

Early life
Spencer was born in Steelton, Pennsylvania in 1937.
She and her two sisters were all born with a thyroid glandular condition that led to rapid weight gain. 

She began singing church solos at the age of three and taught herself to play the piano shortly thereafter.

Recording career
After Spencer graduated from high school, she worked as typist at the capital in Harrisburg, Pennsylvania during the week (she reportedly typed 115 words a minute). On the weekends, she toured the East Coast singing gospel music. In the early 1970s, Spencer was signed to Jaywalking Records.  
Her debut album, Gloria's Views of Glory, was released in 1972. In 2007, the album was reissued online as a digital download by Perfect Records and re-titled, I Got It. Her second album, For Once In My Life, was released in 1976 on Creed Records. The Creed Records release contained a mix of gospel standards and new works, including standards like "Amazing Grace". Her rendition of the gospel standard "I'll Fly Away" is preceded by a spoken word introduction wherein Spencer describes the funeral of her older sister, who died weighing .

Spencer's handlers at Creed Records came up with the idea of promoting her as the "World's Largest Gospel Singer" as a way of gaining interest and attention. She often told stories to media outlets designed to gain interest based on her weight; among them were the story that she required three airline seats in order to fly and that she once had a piano bench break underneath her during a performance. (She told the Gospel News Journal in 1972 that she "kept right on playing - from the floor.")

Personal life and death
While touring, Spencer met Reverend David Gray, a counselor at Kittrell College.
They were married on December 31, 1973 at the Macedonia Baptist Church in Harrisburg. Gray was supportive of Spencer's career and often accompanied her on the road.

Spencer died of congestive heart failure on April 2, 1976.

Her two-day viewing and funeral were held at the Macedonia Baptist Church in Harrisburg, the same church Spencer and her husband were married. Then Harrisburg mayor Harold A. Swenson attended Spencer's funeral while Shirley Caesar performed "Stand By Me".

References

Bibliography

External links
 Gloria Spencer, "I'll Fly Away" via YouTube. Accessed August 28, 2015.
 Gloria C. Spencer Gray via Find A Grave. Accessed November 15, 2022.

1937 births
1976 deaths
20th-century Christians
20th-century American singers
African-American Christians
20th-century African-American women singers
African-American pianists
American women pianists
American gospel singers
American performers of Christian music
Singers from Pennsylvania
Musicians from Harrisburg, Pennsylvania
20th-century American women singers
20th-century American pianists